The Argos-class patrol boat is a model of patrol boat in service in the Portuguese Navy since 1991. This type of ship was designed by the Arsenal do Alfeite, Lisbon, but was built in private shipyards located in Vila Real de Santo António. The ships of the class are mainly employed in the surveillance and control of the Portuguese territorial waters, in Mainland Portugal and in the Madeira Archipelago. The ships are also employed in other missions as the search and rescue, maritime pollution control and force protection of combatant ships in confined waters.

Five ships were built, these being named after constellations.

In 2000, an upgraded version of the Argos class entered service in the Portuguese Navy.

It is to note, that from 1963 to 1975, the Portuguese Navy employed a class of large patrol boats that was also designated Argos class.

Ships of the class

References

External links
 Argos-class, Portuguese Navy website

Patrol vessels of the Portuguese Navy
Patrol boat classes
Ships built in Portugal
Military equipment of Portugal